Serampore Union Institution is a Bengali medium boys' school in India, accredited as an "A-Grade Excellent Educational Institution" by the West Bengal Council of Higher Secondary Education for its brilliant and enviable academic performance. The school is blessed by Pundit Ishwar Chandra Vidyasagar.  Affiliated to the West Bengal Board of Secondary Education and the West Bengal Council of Higher Secondary Education, the institution was founded on January 7, 1884; in 2023, the school is celebrating its 140th anniversary.

Spread over a vast area, close to the river,the Hooghly,in the heart of Serampore (erstwhile  Fredricknagore), a historical city in West Bengal, Serampore Union Institution has been in the centre of many historical events both in the pre and the post~independent India  with her spirited children actively participating in the freedom movement and the process of reformation, social as well as political, besides achieving brilliant academic excellence,spanning over a period of one hundred and forty years since 1884.

Location 
The school is a Bengali medium school (boys) situated at 7 K.M.  Bhattacharya Street, Tinbazar, Serampore - 712201, West Bengal, India.  It is situated at almost 1.5 km towards East from Serampore Town Railway Station on the Howrah–Bardhaman main line, 20 km (north) from Howrah Junction. The western bank of the Hooghly River (Ganges) is just 500 metres away from the school.

Curriculum 
The school offers classes from grade 5 to grade 12. It is under the education board of WBBSE and WBCHSE (W.B.B.S.E. INDEX NUMBER TI-064).

Subjects offered in the Secondary Level (Class V to Class X) 
 First Language: Bengali 
 Second Language: English  
 Third Language: Sanskrit (Class VII & VIII) 
 Mathematics  
 Physical Science / Natural Science 
 Life Science
 History
 Geography
 Computer Education 
 Work Education  
 Physical Education
(Subjects as offered by the West Bengal Board of Secondary Education)

Subjects offered in the Higher Secondary Level (Class XI to Class XII) 
 Science
 Physics
 Chemistry
 Mathematics
 Biology
 Computer Science
 Statistics

 Commerce
 Accountancy
 Business Organisation
 Economics
 Economic Geography
 Mathematics
 Computer Application

Classes are taught in Bengali and English. Subjects as offered by the West Bengal Council of Higher Secondary Education.

Infrastructure 
The school comprises three adjoined buildings and one football ground which include a cricket pitch. The school has an old enviable library, three sophisticated science labs, a physical gym, a hall, and a computer lab with air conditioning and trained teachers.

Teachers
Sri Koushik Chakrabarty (Headmaster)
Smt Kankana Saha (Geography)
Sri Mrityunjoy Das (Mathematics)
Smt Rita Roy (Biology)
Smt Nila Bhattacharya (English)
Smt Anushri Bhattacharya (Chemistry)
Sri Madhav Chandra Dutta (Physics)
Sri Partha Priyo Mondol (History)
Smt Susweta Halder (Biology)
Sri Goutam Gope(Accountancy)
Sri Partha Gangopadhyay (Bangali)
Sri Rajib Mukhopadhyay (English)
Sri Mithun Kumar Bag (English)
Sri Sudipta Datta (English)
Smt Sukanya Das (Geography)
Smt Suchismita Mondol (Bengali)
Sri Raja Das (Bengali)
Sri Subrata Adak (Sanskrit)
Sri Nabakumar Ghosh (Work Education)
Sri Samir Saha (Math)
Sri Prosenjit Saha ((Mathematics)
Sri Avrendu Ghosh (accountancy )
Sri Suman Chakraborty (Chemistry)
Sri Shantonu Chongdar (Bengali)
Smt Monalisa Bannerjee (Computer)
Smt Arundhuti Sengupta (Physics)
Sri Dreamly Dey (Physics)
Sri Srimanta Murmu (History)
Smt Susmritri Panja (Economics)
Sri Sailen Roy (work Education)
Sri Subrata Majhi (Physical Education)
Sri Pranabesh Bhattacharyya (Para Teacher)
Smt Subhra Bhattacharyya (Para Teacher)
Smt Alpana Sarkar Pal (Para Teacher)
Sri Ayon Samanta (ICT Computer Instructor)

Non Teaching Staff  
Sri Sona Das (Clerk)
Sri Ghanshyam Prasad (Gr -D)
Sri Madhab Chandra Banerjee (Gr -D)
Sri Animesh Sarkar (Gr -D)
Smt Angela Halsona (Librarian)

Office Staff
Sri Prabhat Kumar Pal

History 
It was towards the end of the 19th century, led by Sri Naryan Chandra Bhattacharyya, some locals of Serampore, Mahesh and Ballavpore, approached Pandit Iswar Chandra Vidyasagar with a request to open a branch of the Metropolitan High School at Serampore. But Vidyasagar Mahasai advised them to set up a school in the town on their own. With his blessings came up Mahesh Higher Class English School with fifty six students in the year 1884. Later the school moved from Mahesh Higher to Newgate street (Rishi Bankim Sarani) and from there to Poffam House, the present Vidyasagar bhavan of the school building.

In the 1930s the doors of the school were opened for the girls of the town willing to pursue higher education after primary level until Serampore Girls’ High School came up to shoulder the responsibility. During the war the school building also housed some classes of Serampore College.

This historical institution of academic excellence now stands on the threshold of the post-centenary golden jubilee celebration, and there is no end to the journey that began in 1884.

Besides imparting school education par excellence to the students of the town and its adjoining places,the school has also played an important role in the town in creating mass awareness on different social and science related issues involving  the students and the common people.

Several eminent alumni of the school evince her glorious heritage. Acharya Krishna Chandra Bhattacharya (former vice chancellor, Visvabharati University), Prof. Panchanan Singha (Principal, Asutosh College), Dr. Mohini Mohan Ghosh (Ex-Principal, City College), Dr. Basanta Kumar Samanta (eminent mathematician and Ex-Principal, Hooghly Mohosin College and Chandannagore Govt. College), Late Swami Gokulananda Maharaj (Head, Rama Krishna Math & Mission, Delhi), Dr. Mriganka Sekhar Singha, Dr. Gopal Das Nag(former minister, Govt. of West  Bengal), Sahid Gopinath Saha (matyr), Lt. Sankariprasad Mukhopadhyay (freedom fighter), Amiya Mukhopadhyay (captain of The Bengal Athletics), Saroj Chatterjee (goalkeeper, Mohan Bagan) are some of the  famous students of the school besides a great many academicians, scientists technologists, doctors who have made valuable contributions  in their respective fields and thus ensured the emergence of a great nation.

References

External links
 
 http://wbbse.org/shoogli.htm
 http://cerebrumamantes.blogspot.in/
 https://www.facebook.com/pages/Serampore-Union-Institution/158689227561683

Boys' schools in India
High schools and secondary schools in West Bengal
Schools in Hooghly district
Serampore
Educational institutions established in 1884
1884 establishments in India